John Patrick may refer to:

John Patrick (cricketer) (born 1955), Grenadian cricketer
John Patrick (footballer, born 1870) (1870–?), Scottish international footballer of the 1890s
John Patrick (golfer), Scottish professional golfer
John Patrick (rugby union) (1898–1959), American rugby union player
John Patrick (dramatist) (1905–1995), American playwright and screenwriter
John Patrick (Northern Ireland politician) (1898–?), Northern Irish politician for Mid Antrim
John Patrick (Maine politician) (born 1954), American politician and mechanic
John R. Patrick (born 1945), American businessman, former IBM VP
John Patrick, physician, medical ethicist, president of Augustine College
John Patrick, subdean of Lincoln Cathedral
John Patrick (basketball) (born 1968), basketball coach
John Patrick (American football) (1918–2000), American football blocking back
John Douglas Patrick (1863–1937), American painter
Johnny Patrick (born 1988), American football cornerback
John Patrick (footballer, born 2003), Spanish footballer

See also